Things Are Really Great Here, Sort Of... is American singer-songwriter Andrew Bird's eighth solo studio album. It was released on June 3, 2014 through Wegawam Music Co.

The album is a collection of covers of The Handsome Family, an American band Bird knows personally and professionally, having toured and collaborated. Previous covers of their songs include an earlier version of "Don't Be Scared," on Weather Systems, "Giant of Illinois" off the compilation album Dark Was the Night, "When the Helicopter Comes," from Hands of Glory, and "Tin Foiled," on Fingerlings 3. Bird toured with the husband-and-wife duo in 2013.

Reception
The album received a Metacritic score of 76 based on 12 reviews, indicating generally favorable reviews.

The album debuted at No. 12 on Billboard's Folk Albums chart, selling around 2,000 copies in the first week. It has sold 13,000 copies in the US as of March 2016.

Track listing

Charts

Personnel

 Andrew Bird - violin, vocals
 Tift Merritt - vocals, guitar
 Alan Hampton - bass, vocals
 Eric Heywood - Pedal Steel
 Justin Glasco - drums
 David Boucher - recording and mixing
 Jason Harvey - design

References

2014 albums
Andrew Bird albums